Ottapidaram is a small town in Thoothukudi district and headquarters of Ottapidaram taluk.  Ottapidaram is a tourism centre with accessibility to many places in Tamil Nadu. Thoothukudi or Tirunelveli can be easily accessed from anywhere and Ottapidaram is very close to these two places. The great freedom fighter V. O. Chidambaram Pillai called VOC hails from Ottapidaram. VOC is also called as "Kappalottiya Tamizhan" because he launched one of the first shipping companies, Swadeshi Steam Navigation Company which operated ship between Tuticorin and Colombo against the British during the rule in India.

Geography

Distances from nearby towns:
Kovilpatti :  36  km.
Thoothukudi :  32  km.
Vilathukulam :  53  km.
Madurai :  131  km.
Tirunelveli : 56  km.

Demographics
As of 2011, total population of Ottapidaram taluka is 1.2 lakh includes about 63 villages. The population of Ottapidaram city is 7963. Male and female population constitutes equal proportion (i.e.: 50%). There are about 33 thousand households in the Ottapidaram taluka and an average 4 persons live in every family.

Education
Ottapidaram has two schools: V. O. C. Government Higher Secondary School and T. M. B. Mcavoy Rural Higher Secondary School.

Tourism and entertainment
The main attractions in Ottapidaram are

 The house of V. O. Chidambaram Pillai, converted to a library which houses some rare photographs of him
 Temple dedicated to the goddess Ulagamman

Panchalankurichi,  from Ottapidaram, houses a fort constructed by the Tamil Nadu government in the place of the ruined fort constructed by Veerapandiya Kattabomman, who ruled from this place in the 17th century and fought against the British colonial rule. Portions of the original fort can be seen. Kattabomman worshiped at the Jakkammal temple in Panchalankurichi, which also survives.

Transport
Roadways:
The city is connected with nearby towns like Kovilpatti, Tirunelveli, Maniyachi and district headquarters, Thoothukudi by the government and private bus services.

Railways:
Vanchi Maniyachchi Junction railway station south-east about 16 km, the railway junction connecting Tirunelveli and Thoothukudi.  The railways will connect in 45 minutes of the journey to each of the corporation cities. (Tirunelveli and Thoothukudi) Southern railways is planning to lay double line for smooth movement of trains from Villupuram to Thoothukudi and the other phase from "Vanchi Maniyachchi Junction railway station" to Kanyakumari, since long years....

Airways:
The nearest domestic airport is Tuticorin Airport located at Vagaikulam about 26 km away from Ottapidaram.

Economy
The people here are mostly farmers and allied business people. The main agricultural plantations cultivate banana, rice, sugarcane, Greengram (pachchai payaru or paasi payaru or payirtham payaru (Tamil), Blackgram (uḷundhu), cotton, Chili pepper and sesame.

Villages in Ottapidaram Taulka

Ottappidaram
Tharuvaikulam
Panchalankurichi
Sillangulam	
Passuvandanai	
Eppodumvendran	
Kulasekaranallur	
Ackanaickenpatti	
Veppalodai	
Swaminatham
	
Sinthalakottai	
Marudanvalvoonaraikinar	
Savarimangalam	
Keela Arasadi	
Adanur
Ottanatham	
Kila Mudiman	
Jambulingapuram	
Parivallikkottai	
Keela Mangalam	
	
Mela Arasadi	
Chandragiri	
Keelakottai	
Pudur pandiyapuram	
Onamakulam	
Kalappaipatti	
S.Kumarapuram	
Kattunayakkanpatti	
Sillanatham	
Thennampatti
	
Therkuveerapandiyapuram	
Vadanatham	
Ilavelangal	
Vellaram	
Malaipatti	
Maniyachi	
Minakshipuram	
Terku Kalmedu	
Kollankinaru	
Nagampatti
	
Jagaveerapandiapuram	
Kodiyankulam	
D.Duraiswamipuram	
Kudiraikulam	
K.Dalavaipuram	
Mela Maruthur	
K.Shanmukapuram	
Mullur 
Muthukumarapuram
Kolamparambu	

Pudiyamputhur	
Pattanamarudur	
Kottali	
Melapandiyapuram	
Araikkulam	
P.Duraiswamipuram	
Muramban
Govindapuram	
Kumara Ettaiyapuram	
Valasamuthram

Sangampatti	
Venkateswarapuram	
Paraikuttam	
Muthuramalingapuram

See also
Vilathikulam
Kovilpatti
Srivaikuntam
Thiruchendur
Ettayapuram
Vadakku Bommaiyapuram
Melaseithalai

References 

 

Cities and towns in Thoothukudi district